The 2009 edition of the Canadian Polaris Music Prize was presented on September 21, 2009 in Toronto at the Masonic Temple and broadcast live online for the first time in its short history. The award's eligibility period for 2009 covered albums released between June 1, 2008 and May 31, 2009.

Initial coverage of the award's shortlist noted that six of the ten finalists were repeat nominees. K'naan, Malajube and Metric were all finalists in the 2006 shortlist, while Joel Plaskett, Chad VanGaalen and Patrick Watson were all part of the 2007 award, which Watson won. It was the first time in the award's four-year history that any artist was named to the shortlist for a second time.

Winner

Toronto hardcore punk band Fucked Up won with their second album, The Chemistry of Common Life, which despite being controversial, received a great deal of acclaim when it was released in October 2008.

Shortlist
The prize's 10-album shortlist was announced on July 7, 2009.

  Fucked Up, The Chemistry of Common Life
 Elliott Brood, Mountain Meadows
 Great Lake Swimmers, Lost Channels
 Hey Rosetta!, Into Your Lungs (and around in your heart and on through your blood)
 K'naan, Troubadour
 Malajube, Labyrinthes
 Metric, Fantasies
 Joel Plaskett, Three
 Chad VanGaalen, Soft Airplane
 Patrick Watson, Wooden Arms

Longlist
The prize's preliminary 40-album longlist was announced on June 15, 2009.

Sponsors
Sirius Satellite Radio, which had been a supporting sponsor and broadcaster of the awards since their inception, became a primary presenting sponsor of the awards in 2009.

Media
In addition to being broadcast live on CBC Radio 3, the 2009 ceremony was also webcast on MuchMusic's website, as well as produced for later broadcast on MuchMusic.

Jury
The Polaris Music Prize blog began announcing the 2009 jurors one by one in late June 2009. Announced jurors included Corus Entertainment radio programmer Alan Cross, music blogger Bryan Acker (Herohill) and newspaper music critics Sue Carter Flinn (The Coast), Peter Hemminger (FFWD), Serge Paradis (Ici), Stuart Derdeyn (Vancouver Province) and Brendan Murphy (Hour).

References

External links
 Polaris Music Prize
 Polaris Full CDs, 2009 - Hear all 10 Nominated Albums in full

2009 in Canadian music
2009 music awards
2009